Surrency is a town in Appling County, Georgia, United States. The population was 201 at the 2010 census.

History
The Georgia General Assembly incorporated Surrency as a town in 1911. The community was named after Millard Surrency, a pioneer citizen.

Geography

According to the United States Census Bureau, the town has a total area of 0.8 square mile (2.0 km), all land.

Climate

Demographics

As of the census of 2000, there were 237 people, 98 households, and 69 families residing in the town. The racial makeup of the town was 70.89% White, 24.47% African American, 0.84% Native American, 2.95% from other races, and 0.84% from two or more races. Hispanic or Latino people of any race were 2.95% of the population.

There were 98 households, out of which 34.7% had children under the age of 18 living with them, 53.1% were married couples living together, 14.3% had a female householder with no husband present, and 28.6% were non-families. 24.5% of all households were made up of individuals, and 11.2% had someone living alone who was 65 years of age or older.  The average household size was 2.42 and the average family size was 2.84.

In the town, the population was spread out, with 27.4% under the age of 18, 8.9% from 18 to 24, 26.2% from 25 to 44, 24.1% from 45 to 64, and 13.5% who were 65 years of age or older.  The median age was 38 years. For every 100 females, there were 97.5 males.  For every 100 females age 18 and over, there were 100.0 males.

The median income for a household in the town was $30,750, and the median income for a family was $34,583. Males had a median income of $28,750 versus $26,563 for females. The per capita income for the town was $14,794.  About 13.0% of families and 13.8% of the population were below the poverty line, including 14.7% of those under the age of eighteen and 18.4% of those 65 or over.

References

Towns in Appling County, Georgia
Towns in Georgia (U.S. state)